The Hounds of Artemis is an exclusive to audio Doctor Who story, produced as part of BBC Books' New Series Adventures line, and the Eighth entry in the series to be produced. Written by author James Goss and read by Matt Smith, who plays the Eleventh Doctor, and Clare Corbett. It features the Eleventh Doctor and Amy, as well as Helen Stapleton, who acts as another narrator. It was released on 7 April 2011. A free audiobook CD was given in The Guardian weekend edition in February 2011.

References

 EZ Audiobooks

Audiobooks based on Doctor Who
Eleventh Doctor audio plays
2010 audio plays
Works by James Goss